Band Khirkiyan is a Pakistani Urdu-language romantic drama series, Written By Seema Munad, developed by Shahzad Javed, Head of Content, HUM TV, produced by Moomal Shunaid under her banner Moomal Entertainment with Rafay Rashdi as managing partner. The drama aired a weekly episode on Hum TV every Friday and replaced Parchayee. It stars Sarah Khan and Agha Ali.

Plot 
Subuhi accepts the proposal of her cousin Zain, an extremely loving but arrogant and possessive man. Their love vanishes with jealousy, doubts and suffocation, which overpowers their relationship.

Cast 
Agha Ali as Zain
Sarah Khan as Saboohi
Anum Fayyaz as Middat
Agha Mustafa Hassan as Mohid
Seemi Pasha as Zain's Mother
Mariam Mirza as Mohid's Mother
Sajid Shah as Zain's Father
Akbar Islam as Saboohi's Father
Raeed Muhammad Alam as Sameer

Soundtrack 
The title song of Band Khirkiyan was composed by Joshu Keith Benjamin, lyrics for the song were given by Ali Moeen. The OST was performed by Ahmed Jahanzeb who previously sang De Ijazat OST for Hum TV.  The first soundtrack is released on 12 July 2018. The soundtrack was produced along with series production by Moomal Entertainment.

References

External links 
 Hum TV official website

2018 Pakistani television series debuts
Pakistani drama television series
Urdu-language television shows
Hum TV original programming
Hum TV